Robert Berkeley was a High Sheriff and cricketer.

Robert Berkeley may also refer to:

Robert de Berkeley, 3rd feudal baron of Berkeley (died 1220)
Robert Berkeley (MP for Chippenham) (1566–1614), English politician
Robert Berkeley (judge) (1584–1656), English judge and MP for Worcester
Robert Berkeley (writer) (1713–1804), English Catholic publicist 
Robert Berkeley (priest) (died 1654), Anglican priest in Ireland

See also
Robert Barclay (disambiguation)